Frank Zampino is a former Montreal politician and is a chartered accountant.  He served as the Chairman of the executive committee of the Ville de Montréal and was the city's second-ranking official.

Early life
In 1976, Zampino graduated from Laurier Macdonald High School, an English-language public school in the east end of Montreal.

Career

Pre-merger

After studies in accountancy, Zampino served as City Councillor in Saint-Léonard from 1986 to 1990 and was elected Mayor of that city in 1990.  He was re-elected without opposition in 1994 and 1998. From 1998 to 2000, Zampino was the president of the STCUM (Montreal's Transit Commission).

Post-merger

In the aftermath of the Province-Wide Municipal Merger of 2001-2002, Zampino joined Mayor Gérald Tremblay's Montreal Island Citizens Union municipal party.  The organization is now known as Union Montreal.

In 2001, Zampino was elected to the city council of Montreal and as Mayor of the Borough of Saint-Léonard.  Since then, he has served as chairman of the executive committee of the city of Montreal, responsible for finances at the city of Montreal, and as a member of the executive committee of the Montreal Metropolitan Community.

In January 2004, Zampino was appointed by Mayor Tremblay to preside over the committee on finance, administrative and corporate services and strategic management. This same year, Zampino served as the honorary president of the Montreal Open, the annual open golf tournament of Montreal.

In 2005, Zampino remained one of the campaign leaders of Mayor Gérald Tremblay's political team. His efforts paid off and Zampino was re-elected as city councillor and borough mayor and was re-confirmed as chairman of the executive committee. In November 2005, Zampino referred to the mayoral administration as "the Tremblay-Zampino administration."

Retirement

On May 20, 2008, Zampino announced that he would retire from politics during the summer after his 22-year career.  His resignation took effect on July 2, 2008.  Executive Committee Vice-president Claude Dauphin succeeded him.

Corruption scandal

Zampino has been linked to a scandal that has engulfed municipal politics across Quebec since 2009. The Charbonneau Commission heard testimony that Zampino received a trip from Paolo Catania in return for helping Catania acquire land from the city corporation in the east end of Montreal. On May 17, 2012, Zampino was charged with fraud, conspiracy and breach of trust after a two-and-a-half-year long investigation related to awarding municipal contracts. The Faubourg Contrecoeur fraud trial, presided by Quebec Court Judge Yvan Poulin alone, began in February 2016, but was delayed.  On May 2, 2018, Zampino was acquitted of all charges.

Honors
Zampino received the following:
 Knight of the Italian Republic from the Italian government, in 2003
 Fellow of the Ordre des comptables agréés du Québec, in 2004
 Fellow of the Chartered Accountants

See also
 Montreal Island Citizens Union

References

External links
 Official site - Mr. Frank Zampino, FCA, mayor of Saint-Léonard.
 

Canadian people of Italian descent
Mayors of places in Quebec
Montreal city councillors
Living people
People from Saint-Leonard, Quebec
Canadian accountants
People acquitted of fraud
Year of birth missing (living people)